Syagrus botryophora is a species of flowering plant in the family Arecaceae. It is found only in Brazil. It is threatened by habitat loss.

References

botryophora
Flora of Brazil
Near threatened plants
Taxonomy articles created by Polbot